Pogoro may refer to:
 Pogoro, Bam, a village in Bam Province, northern Burkina Faso
 Pogoro-Foulbé, a village in Bam Province, northern Burkina Faso 
 Pogoro, Yatenga, a village in Yatenga Province, Burkina Faso 
 Pogoro language, a Niger–Congo language of Tanzania, East Africa 
 Pogoro people, a people of Tanzania, East Africa
 Pogoro (millipede), a genus of African millipedes in the family Gomphodesmidae